Action for Boston Community Development (ABCD) is an anti-poverty, community development and human services organization founded in 1961 as Boston Community Development Program (BCDP) in Boston, Massachusetts and incorporated as Action for Boston Community Development in 1962, serving as a prototype for urban “human renewal” agencies.

It is the largest non-profit human services agency in New England, annually serving more than 100,000 low-income Greater Boston-area residents through its central offices and a decentralized network of Neighborhood Service Centers (NSCs), Head Start centers, Family Planning sites, and Foster Grandparent sites.

Every year since 1974, ABCD has a Community Awards dinner honoring people and organizations who have made significant contributions to the Boston community especially through their volunteerism.

Citywide network of service centers 
ABCD provides services to the community through a decentralized, citywide network, which includes 15 neighborhood centers.

These centers are usually an Area Planning Action Council (APAC), a Family Service Center (FSC), or a Neighborhood Services Center (NSC).

The neighborhood centers include:
 Allston-Brighton Neighborhood Opportunity Centers
 Asian American Civic Association in Boston's Chinatown (which also publishes the newspaper Sampan since 1972)
 Citywide Boston Hispanic Center, downtown Boston
 Dorchester NSC
 East Boston APAC
 Roxbury / North Dorchester
 Jamaica Plain APAC
 JFK Family Service Center in Charlestown
 Mattapan FSC
 Mystic Valley Opportunity Center serving Malden, Medford, and Everett
 North End / West End NSC
 Parker Hill / Fenway NSC
 South Boston Action Center 
 South End NSC (SNAP)

Schools 
ABCD operates two schools for specialized populations and serve as alternative learning environments.
 William J. Ostiguy High School 
 University High School

Leadership and organizational structure 
The ABCD President/CEO provides operational and visionary leadership to ABCD, reporting to the 50-member ABCD Board of Directors. The Vice Presidents provide management covering every program and employee. Department Heads and Program Directors manage ABCD programs. Neighborhood Directors oversee operations in the many neighborhood-based centers.

History
 1961. Boston residents, with support from Mayor John F. Collins and the Permanent Charity Fund (now called The Boston Foundation), established the Boston Community Development Program (BCDP) to improve quality of life for city residents.
 1962. BCDP was incorporated as Action for Boston Community Development (ABCD), a prototype for urban “human renewal” agencies  (such as Community Action Agencies), with initial funding of $1.9 million from the Ford Foundation. Community activists, including Melnea Cass, founded ABCD.
 1964. Congress passed the Economic Opportunity Act as part of President Lyndon B. Johnson's Great Society campaign and its War on Poverty. The City of Boston designated ABCD as its official anti-poverty agency. ABCD established a neighborhood-based Area Planning Action Council (APAC) system to manage 11 target neighborhoods of acutely concentrated poverty.
 1967. ABCD started the Urban College Program to meet the educational, employment and career development needs of the adult community. This was a collaboration with major Boston area colleges and universities which enabled men and women over the years to earn academic credits toward undergraduate and graduate degrees while still acquiring job-related skills.
 1973. ABCD and three other community action agencies filed a successful class action suit to prevent United States President Richard Nixon from abolishing the Office of Economic Opportunity.
 1982. ABCD received an award received from United States President Ronald Reagan for the private sector initiative in the ABCD/Shawmut Bank/Bank of New England Training Program.
 1993. The Massachusetts Board of Higher Education gives a charter as a degree-granting institution of higher education to the Urban College of Boston, a two-year college, set up by ABCD.
 2006. The Urban College of Boston received continued accreditation from the New England Association of Schools and Colleges (NEASC), Inc. Commission on Institutions of Higher Education.
 2009. Following the death of long-time president and CEO, Robert M. Coard (who had worked for ABCD since 1964 and was its Executive Director since 1968), ABCD's board of directors named John J. Drew as Coard's successor. Prior to his accepting the top post, Drew had served for more than 20 years as ABCD's Vice President.

Programs
ABCD runs a variety of programs for individuals and families living in the City of Boston. The agency's stated goal through these programs is to "meet needs, empower individuals and families, and strengthen communities." These programs include Career Development, Charitable Campaigns, Early Child Care & Education, Elder Services, Financial, Food Pantries, Fuel Assistance/Energy Conservation, Health Services, Housing & Homelessness Prevention, Immigration Services, Youth Development.

Selected program descriptions

Head Start 
ABCD Head Start and Children's Services is the largest early childhood provider in Boston, and is among the top three early childhood providers in the state  

ABCD Head Start and Children's Services is a family development program that serves pregnant women, children from birth to age five, and their families. The Head Start programs that ABCD runs are child-focused and designed to provide opportunities and services to low-income children and families of Boston.

Fuel Assistance 
ABCD Fuel Assistance helps more than 24,000 low-income households in Boston, Brookline and Newton as well as residents of the Mystic Valley Cities, Towns of Malden, Medford, Everette, Melrose, Stoneham, Winchester and Woburn pay fuel bills during the heating season. During the 2008 season, the Fuel Assistance program was able to expand eligibility requirements thanks to increased federal and state funding, up to a family of four with an income of $53,608 being eligible for some assistance.

SummerWorks 
ABCD's SummerWorks program, started in 1965, found jobs for 600 people between the ages of 14-24 during the summer of 2018. Participants receive guidance, comprehensive work readiness and life skills workshops ranging from resume writing, financial education, conflict resolution and workplace etiquette. Many of them will be placed at local non-profit organizations such as hospitals, health centers, museums, day camps, government
agencies and child care centers.

Front Door 
ABCD’s Front Door program has more than 25,000 members. It’s an advanced technology system offering an innovative approach to providing services — maybe more than the one you came in for. Members hold cards which make it easier to access a full range of ABCD services in Boston, Malden, Everett, Medford and several surrounding towns. Improving electronic referrals, eligibility screening, and other functions are important aspects of this initiative, with the goal of helping you and your family feel less stress and more hope.

Field of Dreams 
Action for Boston Community Development with great support from the Boston Red Sox hosts its summertime fundraiser, Field of Dreams at Fenway Park to benefit Greater Boston’s at-risk and underprivileged youth through the ABCD SummerWorks program. Teams – composed of financial, health, law, commercial, and other businesses or private groups – play ball on Boston’s historically famous diamond field, fulfilling a true baseball fanatic’s dream to pitch off the mound in Fenway Park or swing a homerun hit over the Green Monster. Thanks to the generosity and a treasured partnership with the Boston Red Sox, the unique fundraising event allows baseball amateurs and enthusiasts a rare and extremely fun opportunity to dream like a kid, play on an official MLB field, and sponsor an influential program that will help build a youth in-need’s sense of responsibility and community.

Hoop Dreams 
Hoop Dreams is a fundraising event co-founded by the great Boston sportswriter Bob Ryan and Coach Doc Rivers. Generous Boston businesses are getting their game on and recruiting teams to play at ABCD’s Hoop Dreams, a unique charity basketball tournament played on the legendary TD Garden parquet. They get to live out a fantasy – drive the lane or make that three-pointer at the buzzer – while making a huge impact on the lives of young people in need.

References

Non-profit organizations based in Boston
Organizations established in 1962
Civil rights organizations in the United States
Community development organizations
Affordable housing advocacy organizations
Immigration political advocacy groups in the United States
Housing in Massachusetts